This is a recap of the 1988 season for the Professional Bowlers Association (PBA) Tour.  It was the tour's 30th season, and consisted of 35 events.

Brian Voss won two titles on the season, including his first major at the Trustcorp PBA National Championship. Voss also set a single-season earnings record ($225,485) and was crowned PBA Player of the Year.

Mark Williams earned his second Firestone Tournament of Champions title, having also won the event in 1985. Pete Weber took home the trophy and $100,000 first prize in the Seagram's Coolers U.S. Open.

Bob Benoit, in his very first TV finals appearance, rolled the PBA's fifth televised 300 game in winning the Quaker State Open. It was the PBA Tour's first televised 300 game that was shot in the final championship match.

Tournament schedule

References

External links
1988 Season Schedule

Professional Bowlers Association seasons
1988 in bowling